Georges Pierre Dutriac (born 17 November 1866 in Bordeaux – 17 March 1958 in Charenton-le-Pont) was a French painter and illustrator.

Life
Active from 1902 to 1942, Dutriac exhibited at the Salon de la société des artistes français from 1893.

References

Sources

External links 
 Georges Dutriac in Joconde database
 

1866 births
1958 deaths
Artists from Bordeaux
French draughtsmen
20th-century French illustrators
20th-century French painters
20th-century French male artists